Narrow is the second album by Austrian musical project Soap&Skin, released in 2012 on Play It Again Sam Records. It was heavily influenced by the death of her father, stating she wrote the songs after being admitted to a clinic. The cover of the French singer Desireless synthpop hit "Voyage, Voyage" was used in the movie Stilleben, where Anja debuted as an actress.

In 2012 it was awarded a silver certification from the Independent Music Companies Association which indicated sales of at least 20,000 copies throughout Europe.

Track listing
All songs written by Anja Plaschg, except where noted.

"Vater" - 5:36
"Voyage, Voyage" (Dominique Albert Dubois, Jean-Michel Rivat) - 5:18
"Deathmental" - 4:45
"Cradlesong" - 2:11
"Wonder" - 3:14
"Lost" - 1:57
"Boat Turns Toward The Port" - 3:07
"Big Hand Nalls Down" - 2:54
 "Jail" - 0:55 [= iTunes - Bonustrack]

References

External links
 Soap&Skin official website

2012 albums
Soap&Skin albums